Nitella flexilis, the smooth stonewort, is a freshwater species of characean algae that is used as a model organism for its large cell size and relative ease of cultivation in the laboratory.

Description
A robust species growing up to a meter long with axes up to 1mm wide. Branches in whorls once or twice divided.

Distribution
The species occurs on all continents of the world except Australia. It has been recorded from several counties in Ireland. From the Eglinton Canal in Galway; and in Counties Down and Londonderry; River Dorree in Clare Island Co. Mayo 2004.

References

Charophyta